World Perfume was a perfume company based in Dallas, Texas.  The president of the company, Johnny Whitworth, was once a distributor for Scentura.  World Perfume distributors bought perfume from headquarters and recruited salesmen with newspaper ads.  Door-to-door salespeople were paid based on their sales commission, with no salary.

Like Scentura, media publicity of the company was negative.

The company was opened in 1989. It closed in 2007.

References

External links 

Direct marketing
Perfumery
Defunct companies based in Texas
Companies established in 1989
Companies disestablished in 2007